Robert Manning (1655 in Amsterdam – 4 March 1731 in Ingatestone Hall) was an English Roman Catholic priest and controversialist.

Biography
Born to an English mother and Dutch father, Robert Manning entered the English College, Douai in 1668, and later taught humanities and philosophy there. Ordained priest in 1690, he was sent to the English mission in 1692, becoming chaplain to Lord Petre and other members of the Petre family at Ingatestone Hall.

He died in Essex on 4 March 1731.

Works
The Shortest Way to End Disputes about Religion, 1716
Modern Controversy, 1720
The Case Stated between the Church of Rome and the Church of England, 1721
The Reform'd Churches Proved Destitute of a Lawful Ministry, 1722
England's Conversion and Reformation Compared, 1725
Moral Entertainments, 1742

References

Further reading
C. J. Mitchell, 'Robert Manning and Thomas Howlatt: English Catholic Printing in the Early Eighteenth Century', Recusant History 17:1 (1984), pp. 38–47

External links

1655 births
1731 deaths
17th-century English Roman Catholic priests
18th-century English Roman Catholic priests